Rosbach vor der Höhe is a town in the district of Wetteraukreis, in Hesse, Germany. It is located 25 kilometres north of Frankfurt am Main, on the eastern side of the Taunus mountain range. The town has a population of approximately 12,000.

History 
The first documented mention of Rosbach took place in 884. The district Rodheim was already mentioned in 805. Archeological discoveries dates the first settlements back to Neolithic ages and the era of the Celts.

The origin of the name Rosbach is still unknown. The town was named after the nearby stream of the same name, obviously. The most accepted version of the origin of the word Rosbach itself is, that it is derived from the Middle High German roezen or rozen (to ret). The most common craft in Rosbach was the weaving of linen and retting is used to describe the process of the separation of the fibre from the stem during the production of linen.

In 884 Rosbach was annected to the Fulda monastery due to a gift by the Emperor Charles the Fat. In 1663, Rosbach received town privileges under the control of the Landgraviate of Hesse-Darmstadt, the Count of Nassau and the Electorate and Archbishopric of Trier.

Rosbach was a part of the Historic road along the Long Hesse connecting Frankfurt and Leipzig. During 1850 and 1926 manganese ore was mined in 80 mine workings. During this time the natural resource brought technological progress and the population increased dramatically. In 1901 Nieder-Rosbach was connected to the rail network of Germany as part of the rail connection between Friedberg and Bad Homburg.

In 1912 the common district of Ober- und Nieder-Rosbach was separated. In 1970 Nieder-Rosbach was incorporated by Ober-Rosbach. In August 1972 Rodheim losts its independence in terms of local politics and is a part of the town Rosbach since.

Geography

Location 
To the north, Rosbach borders Friedberg; to the east, Wöllstadt; to the south, Karben; and to the west, Bad Homburg, Friedrichsdorf and Wehrheim. Rosbach is located 25 km north of Frankfurt in the district Wetteraukreis at the Eastern side of the Taunus mountain range. The streams Fahrenbach and Rosbach in Ober-Rosbach and Nieder-Rosbach, respectively, flow into the Nidda.

Geology 
Between 1998 and 2000, there was a discussion about an impact crater near Rosbach called Rosbach Krater.
Starting with an article in the local newspaper Wetterauer Zeitung, articles in other newspapers as the Frankfurter Rundschau and the Frankfurter Allgemeine Zeitung were published. A mineralogist and his team from the University of Marburg found planare Strukturen (lit. planar structures) of the mineral quartz, arguing these are evident results to call the crater a result of a meteorite impact. Two weeks later they revised their previous interpretation, saying those planar elements are Boehm lamellae instead. Thus the "crater" with its deformed lamellae seems to have been created during the formation of the Taunus mountain range rather than by a meteorite.

Town subdivisions 
Rosbach vor der Höhe consists of three separate villages—Ober-Rosbach (Upper Rosbach), Nieder-Rosbach (Lower Rosbach) and Rodheim.

The distribution of the population is as follows:

Politics

District council 

The results of the last municipal election in 2011 are listed in the table below and are compared to those of 2006 and 2001:

Arms and flag 

Blazon: Or, chevron gules, base flower rose gules, seeded or barbed vert, chief dexter brick tower azure, chief sinister plowshare azure.
In English: A red chevron on a gold sign; at the bottom a, green barbed and golden seeded, red rose; in the upper left a blue brick tower; in the upper right a blue plowshare.

Heraldry: The plowshare stands for Nieder-Rosbach; the tower stands for Rodheim; the rose, the insignia of Ober-Rosbach, stands for Rosbach as a whole.

International relations 
Rosbach is twinned with:

  Netzschkau, Saxony, Germany (since 1990)
  Ciechanowiec, Poland (since 1995)
  Saint-Germain-lès-Corbeil, Essonne, France (since 1995)

Economy and infrastructure

Traffic 
The town is located at the motorway access Autobahn A5 directing to Frankfurt and Kassel. This motorway access has a high traffic density as the majority of the commuters from the Western Wetteraukreis working in Frankfurt travel via Rosbach to their place of work.
The train station in Nieder-Rosbach connects Friedberg and Friedrichsdorf.

Local businesses 
The industrial park with an area of 0.44 km2 is quite huge in relation to the living area with 4.46 km2 in size. This relies on its location to the motorway access directing to Frankfurt.

Rosbacher Mineralwasserquelle (mineral water brand; since 2001 part of Hassia Mineralquellen GmbH & Co. KG)
REWE Deutscher Supermarkt KGaA (supermarket chain), administrative building and center of distribution
Triumph Motorcycles Ltd. (motorcycle manufacturer), German headquarters
Trigema GmbH & Co. KG (conglomerate of textile industry and filling stations)

Culture and sights

Points of interest

Kapersburg 

The Kapersburg is located three kilometres to the west of Ober-Rosbach and is one of the best preserved Roman forts of the Limes Germanicus in Germany. It was excavated around the turn of the 20th century.
In 2005, as a part of the Upper Germanic limes, the remnants of the Upper Germanic & Rhaetian Limes were inscribed on the List of UNESCO World Heritage Sites as Frontiers of the Roman Empire. Thereafter an archeological park was built around the fort.
The fort was built presumably during the time of Emperor Trajan in 98, or of Emperor Hadrian in 130. The occupation withdrawed in the third century, as the occupations of other forts during that time. As a result the fort was diminished and a wall was built in the middle of the fort. The end of the fort enforced non-violently and is dated to the middle of the third century.

Wasserburg 
The Wasserburg is not really a castle. It might have been built as a motte as insignia of the ministerialis.

Wehrturm 
The Wehrturm is a fortified tower of mediaeval times in the old center of Ober-Rosbach. It is now the location of the municipal archive from the Heimatgeschichtsverein 1984 Rosbach v. d. Höhe e.V. (Association for Local History Rosbach).

Faselstall 
The Faselstall was a former stable with a tavern in the backyard of the old town hall of Rodheim. It is now the location of the municipal archive from the Rodheimer Geschichts- und Heimatverein e.V. (Association for Local History Rodheim).

Steinkopf 

The highest point of the Eastern Taunus edge is the Steinkopf with a height of 518 m. The mountain lies in between Ober-Rosbach and Pfaffenwiesbach, part of the town Wehrheim.

Regular events 
Blütenfest, Altstadtfest, Schwimmbadfest, Burgfest, Rosbach goes Gospel

Personalities 
 Wilhelm Christoph von Hessen-Bingenheim und Hessen-Homburg (13 November 1625 in Ober-Rosbach – 27 August 1681 in Bingenheim), Landgrave of Hessen-Homburg, was born in Ober-Rosbach
 Johann Ludwig Christ (18 October 1739 in Öhringen – 18 November 1813 in Kronberg), German naturalist, gardener and pastor, worked from 1776 to 1786 as a pastor in Rodheim
 Katherine Halberstadt (1879 in Essen – 18 January 1926 in Artesia, California), the mother of First Lady Pat Nixon, was a German immigrant from Ober-Rosbach
 Adolf Reichwein (3 October 1898 in Bad Ems – 20 October 1944 in Berlin-Plötzensee, executed), German educator, economist, cultural policymaker for the Social Democratic Party of Germany, resistance fighter in Nazi Germany, grew up in Ober-Rosbach
 Frank Farian (born on 18 July 1941 in Kirn), German record producer, singer-songwriter, used his recording studio in Ober-Rosbach until 2005
 Jessica Wahls (born on 2 February 1977 in Bad Nauheim), German pop singer, songwriter and television host, member of the German all-female band No Angels, grew up and lives in Rodheim

References

External links 
 
  
 Heimatgeschichtsverein 1984 Rosbach v. d. Höhe e.V. Website of the Association for Local History of Rosbach 
 Rodheimer Geschichts- und Heimatverein e.V. Website of the Association for Local History of Rodheim 

Wetteraukreis